La Posada de Santa Fe, formerly known as La Posada Inn, is a hotel in Santa Fe, New Mexico that dates back to a mansion built in 1882.

Staab mansion
In 1882, merchant Abraham Staab built a three-story French Second Empire-style mansion in the heart of Santa Fe. It was the first brick mansion in Santa Fe. The property was home for Staab, his wife and their six children. Some accounts claim that the property is haunted by the spirit of Abraham's wife, Julia Schuster Staub. Julia died in 1896 and Abraham in 1913.

Creation of La Posada Inn
In 1930, Robert H. Nason of Chicago purchased the Staab home and surrounding acreage. Nason built a Santa Fe-style building with 30 apartments on the property. The apartment building, designed and built by Dick Riley, opened in 1935 under the name La Posada. The original mansion was also converted into eight apartments. Nason then added a hotel, the La Posada Inn, and a restaurant, the Cactus Tea Room. The inn was leased to Mr. and Mrs. Harvey S. Durand Jr. in 1953.

Subsequent renovations
In 1987 and 1988, the owners undertook a $2-million renovation of the Posada's bar and guest rooms (including casitas that had served as stables or outbuildings on the Staab estate), and addition of eight new rooms in a separate executive-suite complex.

The Posada was purchased in 1997 by Olympus Corp., a Dallas real-estate firm.  The new owner closed the property in November 1998 for a renovation and expansion, designed by architects Lloyd & Tryk, that reportedly cost between $12 and $18 million. It reopened in August 1999 with 159 rooms, nine new buildings, a 5,000-square-foot spa, 4,500 square feet of meeting and conference space, a new swimming pool, and 40 new rooms for a total of 159 casitas and suites. The new structures were designed to conform either to the property's pueblo or territorial-style architecture.

In 2013, Joseph C. Smith purchased the property from the prior owner's lender. Smith affiliated the hotel with Starwood Hotels & Resorts.

It is a member of the Historic Hotels of America.

References

Hotels in New Mexico
Pueblo Revival architecture in Santa Fe, New Mexico
Historic Hotels of America